

Politics

Pax Mongolica

Coined as a parallel to Pax Romana, the Pax Mongolica (Latin for "Peace of the Mongols") was the term for a situation where trade between China and Europe in the 13th and 14th centuries was common and free from profound interference. Although the Mongol system of administration and governance during the brief era was not exactly peaceful,  the Pax Mongolica was a time of relative peace throughout the Old World that led to an increase of trade, as well as an increase in awareness, between distant nations. In essence, the Mongol Empire administered political order over a very large area of land which enabled relative political and economic stability to follow.

In the face of the ethnic, religious, and tribal diversity of the civilians and soldiers of the Mongol Empire, which eventually included modern-day Persians, Chinese, and many Turkic peoples, Genghis Khan insisted on focusing all loyalty on himself as Great Khan and no others. Thus, Genghis Khan had no room for the traditional clan- and kindred-based divisions that were common in Central Asian society. Obedience was expected from everyone from the lowest to the highest classes. Any disobedience by a subordinate officer to any order from a superior officer was a reason for death.

Genghis Khan revolutionized his military by incorporating the decimal system in his army. He arranged his army into arbans (inter-ethnic groups of ten), and the members of an arban were commanded to be loyal to one another regardless of ethnic origin. The military units sizes were based on factors of 10: arbans (10 people), zuuns (100), Mingghans (1000) and tumens (10,000). This decimal system organization of Genghis Khan's strong military proved very effective in conquering, by persuasion or force, the many tribes of the central Asian steppe, but it also strengthened Mongol society as a whole.

Government Legacy

Genghis Khan’s united Mongol nation formed the foundation of the largest continuous land empire ever known. While he is responsible for untold amounts of death and destruction during his life, some of the positive features of his reign have been noted by historians:

Literacy and official record-keeping began with the first written Mongolian script, created by adapting the alphabet of the Uighur people of western Mongolia.
Councils of leaders and a “cabinet” of advisers drawn from different tribes and nations were held to establish policies and make decisions.
Laws and directions, referred to as the Great Yassa, defined Mongol behavior.
Religious freedom was extended to all denominations in the belief that the support of religious leaders would foster good relations with the people.
Civil Service appointments were based on merit, regardless of nationality or connections.
International passports provided protection for the diplomatic representatives of any nation, facilitating safe passage and trade.
Rapid communication depended upon the Yam, an efficient mounted messenger service.

Meritocracy
Genghis Khan preferred to rule through existing hierarchies, but where he was resisted he destroyed the existing aristocracy. Nevertheless, he created at the same time a rough meritocracy among the Mongols. Positions of honor were given on the basis of bravery in battle or outstanding loyalty, as opposed to the old system of inheritance through families.

Freedom of Religion

Various languages spread, such as Turkish, replacing long-established Persian-speaking populations who were mostly wiped out.  Many different kinds of religion existed under a limited degree of freedom of religion.
However, in later life, Genghis began to research the various religions of the people he had suppressed. Theories differ as to why. The outcome was a general freedom of religion, and an exemption of taxes for priests.

Economy

Trade
Having conquered a vast land, Genghis Khan and his successors encouraged trade and exchange.  Mongols valued goods that came from other lands and peoples. A unified Mongol Empire made travel across Asia far easier for Europeans than it had been under a fractured group of minor kings, facilitating greater exposure to the West and travel for Western traders such as Marco Polo.
Because of the extent of his empire, Genghis Khan deeply affected the cultures of many Asian and European countries, most notably Russia.

References

Genghis Khan
Mongol Empire